Maik Walpurgis (born 9 October 1973) is a German football coach who last managed Dynamo Dresden.

References

External links

1973 births
Living people
German football managers
VfL Osnabrück managers
FC Gütersloh 2000 managers
FC Ingolstadt 04 managers
Bundesliga managers
3. Liga managers
People from Herford
Sportspeople from Detmold (region)
Footballers from North Rhine-Westphalia
Sportfreunde Lotte managers
Dynamo Dresden managers
Association footballers not categorized by position
2. Bundesliga managers
Association football players not categorized by nationality